Piegan Falls is a waterfall in Glacier National Park, Montana, US. Piegan Falls have several major drops in its  descent from the slopes of Piegan Mountain and Piegan Glacier. The falls are seen from the trails above Siyeh Bend en route to Piegan Pass.

References

Landforms of Glacier County, Montana
Landforms of Glacier National Park (U.S.)
Waterfalls of Glacier National Park (U.S.)